Leendert "Leo" Roelandschap (Amersfoort, 11 May 1985), better known by his stage name Bizzey, is a Dutch hip hop performer and DJ.

Bizzey grew up in the Dutch towns Leusden and Amersfoort. His father owned a record shop in Amersfoort (Radio Roelandschap).

In 2010, Bizzey founded the group Yellow Claw together with Jim Aasgier (Jim Taihuttu) and Nizzle (Nils Rondhuis). They started off with a theme night in the Amsterdam night club Jimmy Woo and produced remixes for other performers. The group toured multiple countries and worked together with international artists. Bizzey left Yellow Claw in 2016 to focus on a solo career as MC Bizzey, mostly in the Netherlands. His YouTube video "Traag" ("Slow") received millions of views (and was especially popular in Turkey).

From the end of 2017 until November 2018, Bizzey was the manager of artist Famke Louise. Whom he helped with the start of her career.

In June 2019, Bizzey won a FunX Music Award in the category Artist of the year - male.

Discography

Albums

Singles

References

Dutch DJs
Dutch rappers
1985 births
Living people